Teodoro Guillermo Waldner (1927 – 2014) was an Argentine Air Force commander who served as Air Force Chief of the General Staff from 1983 to 1985.

According to the Argentine newspaper El Diario, during the Falklands War, Waldner led a mission to Libya and brought back weapons and missiles from Gaddafi's regime.  After the war, in 1983 Waldner became the first head of the Air Force since the return of democracy to Argentina and was styled as a chief of staff as opposed to a commander-in-chief. In 1985, Waldner was appointed as Chief of Joint Staff of the Armed Forces, a position he held until his retirement in 1989.

References

 

|-
 

1927 births
2014 deaths
Argentine people of German descent
Argentine Air Force brigadiers